Shipka Saddle (Shipchenska Sedlovina \'ship-chen-ska se-dlo-vi-'na\) is a deep ice-covered saddle in Tangra Mountains, Livingston Island, Antarctica between Friesland Ridge to the west and Levski Ridge to the east. The feature is 250 m long, with an elevation ca. 1,200 m. It forms part of the divide between the glacial catchments of Huron Glacier to the north and Macy Glacier to the south.

Shipka is the name of a pass in the Stara Planina (Balkan Mountains) in central Bulgaria.

Location
Co-ordinates, elevation and distances given according to a 1995-96 Bulgarian topographic survey and the Tangra 2004/05 survey.

Maps
 L.L. Ivanov et al. Antarctica: Livingston Island and Greenwich Island, South Shetland Islands. Scale 1:100000 topographic map. Sofia: Antarctic Place-names Commission of Bulgaria, 2005.
 L.L. Ivanov. Antarctica: Livingston Island and Greenwich, Robert, Snow and Smith Islands. Scale 1:120000 topographic map.  Troyan: Manfred Wörner Foundation, 2009.

References
 Shipka Saddle. SCAR Composite Antarctic Gazetteer
 Bulgarian Antarctic Gazetteer. Antarctic Place-names Commission. (details in Bulgarian, basic data in English)

External links
 Shipka Saddle. Copernix satellite image

Tangra Mountains